Coin is a city in Page County, Iowa, United States. The population was 176 at the time of the 2020 census. The Wabash Trace—a railroad converted to a bicycle trail—passes through here. It is also the hometown of running coach and fitness writer Joe Henderson.

History
Coin was platted in 1879, on the Chicago, Burlington and Quincy Railroad line. The origin of the name "Coin" is obscure.

Geography
Coin is located at  (40.656943, -95.234142) along the Tarkio River.

Demographics

2010 census
As of the census of 2010, there were 193 people, 79 households, and 56 families living in the city. The racial makeup of the city was 94.3% White and 5.7% from two or more races. Hispanic or Latino of any race were 7.3% of the population.

There were 79 households, of which 27.8% had children under the age of 18 living with them, 49.4% were married couples living together, 13.9% had a female householder with no husband present, 7.6% had a male householder with no wife present, and 29.1% were non-families. 22.8% of all households were made up of individuals, and 8.8% had someone living alone who was 65 years of age or older. The average household size was 2.44 and the average family size was 2.86.

The median age in the city was 44.5 years. 26.4% of residents were under the age of 18; 4.7% were between the ages of 18 and 24; 19.2% were from 25 to 44; 31.2% were from 45 to 64; and 18.7% were 65 years of age or older. The gender makeup of the city was 48.7% male and 51.3% female.

2000 census

As of the census of 2000, there were 252 people, 102 households, and 68 families living in the city. The racial makeup of the city was 99.60% White, and 0.40% from two or more races. Hispanic or Latino of any race were 0.79% of the population.

There were 102 households, out of which 35.3% had children under the age of 18 living with them, 53.9% were married couples living together, 8.8% had a female householder with no husband present, and 32.4% were non-families. 31.4% of all households were made up of individuals, and 15.7% had someone living alone who was 65 years of age or older. The average household size was 2.47 and the average family size was 3.03.

26.6% are under the age of 18, 7.5% from 18 to 24, 24.6% from 25 to 44, 22.6% from 45 to 64, and 18.7% who were 65 years of age or older. The median age was 39 years. For every 100 females, there were 92.4 males. For every 100 females age 18 and over, there were 98.9 males.

The median income for a household in the city was $33,500, and the median income for a family was $45,313. Males had a median income of $30,250 versus $24,500 for females. The per capita income for the city was $16,080. About 3.1% of families and 7.5% of the population were below the poverty line, including 3.8% of those under the age of eighteen and 17.0% of those 65 or over.

Education
It is in the South Page Community School District.

Government 
The incumbent mayor is Rickie Willis, since January 1st, 2022. The mayor pro-tem and is Barbara McCollum. City Council Members include Marie Miller, Rebecca Willis, Jacquelyn Autry and Ruby Thomas. The City Maintenance Superintendent is Dave Rine, and the City Clerk is Amie Johnson.

References

Cities in Iowa
Cities in Page County, Iowa